An area of relevant ecological interest (Arie) is a type of protected area of Brazil with unusual natural features and with little or no human occupation.

Definition

"Area of relevant ecological interest" is among the types of sustainable use protected area defined by Law No. 9.985 of 18 July 2000, which established the National System of Conservation Units (SNUC).
It is generally a small area with little or no human occupation that has unique natural features or that harbours rare examples of regional biota.
It was created to maintain these natural ecosystems of regional or local importance, and to regulate the permissible use of these areas where compatible with the objectives of conservation of nature.
The area may consist of public or private land subject to laws which may impose rules and restrictions on use of private land in such an area.

Examples

Areas of relevant ecological interest include:

Notes

Sources

Types of protected area of Brazil